The H&BR Class G3 (LNER Class J75) was a class of  steam locomotives of the Hull and Barnsley Railway (H&BR). The H&BR became part of the North Eastern Railway (NER) in 1922 and the NER became part of the London and North Eastern Railway (LNER) in 1923.

Rebuilding
The locomotives were built with domeless boilers working at 150 psi.  Starting in 1922, 14 of the 16 were rebuilt with domed boilers working at 175 psi.

Withdrawal
They were withdrawn between 1937 and 1949. One locomotive survived into British Railways (BR) ownership in 1948 and was given the BR number 68365. None were preserved.

References

M3
0-6-0T locomotives
Kitson locomotives
Railway locomotives introduced in 1901
Scrapped locomotives
YEC locomotives
Standard gauge steam locomotives of Great Britain